Mark Heidelberger is a music video, commercial, documentary and feature film producer. He was born in West Chester, Pennsylvania, on August 5, 1977.  He is a founder of the entertainment production company Treasure Entertainment.

Early life 
His father Eric was an aerospace engineer and his mother Theresa was a human resources manager, both working at General Electric and later Lockheed Martin.

Heidelberger graduated number one in his class with a Bachelor of Arts in Film Studies from UC Santa Barbara in 2000 and earned a Master of Fine Arts in Motion Picture and Television Producing from the UCLA School of Theater, Film and Television in 2003.

Career 

Early in his career, Heidelberger held entry-level or assistant positions at companies like Outlaw Productions, Film Roman and literary agency Ken Sherman & Associates.

He started Treasure Entertainment with partner Jesse Felsot in 2000. He has produced a number of music videos for clients such as Sony BMG/Latino, Upstairs Records, Nashville-based Stringtown Records, Bad Boy Records, Atlantic Records, Sony-based Immortal Records, and Jerry Heller (former president of Eazy E's Ruthless Records). He has also produced commercials for a diversity of companies such as Puma, Con Air, Lamborghini, Time Warner Cable and Cox Media.

He executive-produced an independent dramedy feature called Cycles, served as a producer on award-winning NBA basketball docu-drama Flintown Kids, and also helped develop and package the indie thriller Don Mckay, starring Thomas Haden Church, Elisabeth Shue and Melissa Leo.

Through Treasure Entertainment, where Heidelberger served as co-chairman and chief executive officer, he co-produced the gritty urban drama Harsh Times starring Christian Bale and Eva Longoria and a behind-the-scenes video documenting the making of the film. He also produced the feature-length documentary Who Stole The Soul?, which centers on the rise and fall of the R&B movement amid the proliferation of gangsta rap.

In 2006, he developed and co-executive produced the family feature film You've Got A Friend for The Hallmark Channel, starring John Schneider, Dylan McLaughlin and Bitty Schram, which premiered on Hallmark in 2007. Then, in 2008, Heidelberger produced and served as production manager on the indie comedy feature Man Overboard, which premiered on HBO in Europe.

He followed that up in 2011 with the horror web series Chopper, starring Tyler Mane and Andrew Bryniarski, based on the popular comic book.

In 2012, he produced the romantic comedy feature It’s Not You, It’s Me, starring Vivica Fox, Joelle Carter and Ross McCall. The following year, he produced the supernatural martial arts film Ninja Apocalypse, starring Cary-Hiroyuki Tagawa and Ernie Reyes, Jr., which premiered at San Diego’s Comic-Con in 2014.

He then produced the award-winning Chinese-American romance film Comfort, which premiered in competition at Cinequest, and served as associate producer on the Southern noir thriller Mississippi Murder, starring Malcolm McDowell and Luke Goss.

In 2015, he produced a holiday film called A New York Christmas, released by Shoreline Entertainment, starring Jamie Bamber, Tracie Thoms and Jasika Nicole. He quickly followed that up as co-producer and UPM on Pray for Rain from ESX Productions and Lucas Oil, a mystery starring Jane Seymour, Missi Pyle and Paul Rodriguez.

In 2016, he produced horror movie The Basement, starring Mischa Barton, followed by Chinese new media series The Offer the following year.

In 2018, he worked on several feature documentary projects, including Lil Buck Renaissance for French director Louis Wallecan and Somewhere in the Middle for longtime collaborator Nathan Ives.

He graduated with a bachelor of arts in film studies from UC Santa Barbara and a master of fine arts in motion picture and television producing from the UCLA School of Theater, Film and Television.

He lives in Los Angeles with his wife, Erika Heidelberger, and serves as a freelance producer, line producer, production manager, post production supervisor and development consultant. He is a member of the Producers Guild of America.

Filmography 
 Cycles (2001)
 Flintown Kids (2005)
 Harsh Times (2006)
 You've Got A Friend (2007)
 Man Overboard (2008) 
 Who Stole The Soul? (2009)
 Chopper (2011)
 It's Not You, It's Me (2012)
 Ninja Apocalypse (2014)
 Comfort (2015)
 A New York Christmas (2016)
 Mississippi Murder (2016)
 Pray for Rain (2017)
 The Basement (2018)
 The Offer (2018)
 Somewhere in the Middle (2019)

References 

1977 births
Living people
American film producers